Sclerotinia spermophila is a plant pathogen, infecting red clover, but can also be considered an animal pathogen.

References

External links
 USDA ARS Fungal Database

Fungal plant pathogens and diseases
Sclerotiniaceae
Fungi described in 1948